is a Japanese film director. His film Into the White Night was screened in the Main Programme of the Panorama section at the 61st Berlin International Film Festival.

In an interview, Fukagawa explains that there have been many versions of Into the White Night, but he wanted to challenge himself and create his own rendition. Through his film, he wanted to focus on the more emotional and human feelings, while retaining the logic expressed in the novel.

Filmography
 Classmates (2008)
 Taiikukan Baby (2008)
 Looking Up at the Half Moon (2010)
 Into the White Night (2011)
 Patisserie Coin de rue (2011)
 In His Chart (2011)
 In His Chart 2 (2014)
 Sagrada Reset: Part 1 (2017)
 Sagrada Reset: Part 2 (2017)
 Restaurant from the Sky (2019)
 The Legacy of Dr. Death: Black File (2020)
 Love Like the Falling Petals (2022)
 Houtei Yugi (2023)

References

1976 births
Japanese film directors
Living people
People from Chiba Prefecture